The Centre Covered Bridge, also known as the Sanborn Covered Bridge, is a historic covered bridge, spanning the Passumpsic River next to U.S. Route 5 (US 5) north of the village of Lyndonville, Vermont. Built in 1872, it was moved to its present location and taken out of service in 1960. It is one of three surviving Paddle-Ford truss bridges in Vermont. It was listed on the National Register of Historic Places in 1974.

Description and history
The Centre Covered Bridge is located just west (downstream) of US 5 on the northern outskirts of the village of Lyndonville. It is a single-span Paddleford truss structure, set on concrete abutments, and is oriented north–south across the Passumpsic River. What is left of its deteriorating deck is made of wooden planking. The bridge is covered by a metal roof with very long eaves, and has vertical board siding extending over the lower half of the trusses on the sides. The portals project beyond the ends of the trusses, and are also sheathed in vertical boards. The portal openings are framed as segmented arches. A sidewalk (also with deteriorated and unusable decking) is cantilevered on the outside of the east side.

It was moved in 1960 to its present location, at which time it was closed to traffic. The bridge is one of three surviving Paddleford truss bridges in the state, and is the longest of those three. The outside walkway is one of five such features found on covered bridges in the state.

See also
 
 
 
 List of covered bridges in Vermont
 National Register of Historic Places listings in Caledonia County, Vermont
 List of bridges on the National Register of Historic Places in Vermont

References

Covered bridges on the National Register of Historic Places in Vermont
Buildings and structures in Lyndon, Vermont
Long truss bridges in the United States
Covered bridges in Caledonia County, Vermont
National Register of Historic Places in Caledonia County, Vermont
Bridges completed in 1872
Wooden bridges in Vermont
Road bridges in Vermont
1872 establishments in Vermont